The men's coxless pair competition at the 1976 Summer Olympics took place at Notre Dame Island Olympic Basin, Canada.

Competition format

The competition consisted of three main rounds (heats, semifinals, and finals) as well as a repechage after the heats. 

 The 15 boats were divided into three heats for the first round, with 5 boats in each heat. The top 3 boats in each heat advanced directly to the semifinals (9 boats total). The remaining 6 boats competed in a single-heat repechage. 

 The top 3 boats in the repechage advanced to the semifinals; the bottom 3 boats were eliminated.

 The semifinals consisted of two heats of 6 boats each. The top 3 boats in each semifinal advanced to the "A" final (1st through 6th place). The 4th through 6th place boats were placed in the "B" final (7th through 12th place).

All races were over a 2000 metre course.

Results

Heats

Heat 1

Heat 2

Heat 3

Repechage

Semifinals

Semifinal 1

Semifinal 2

Finals

Final B

Final A

Final classification

References

Rowing at the 1976 Summer Olympics
Men's events at the 1976 Summer Olympics